St Patrick's Church is a heritage-listed Roman Catholic church on Grote Street, Adelaide, South Australia.  Opened in 1914, St Patrick's was built as a replacement for the original St. Patrick's church that is considered the first Catholic Church in Adelaide.  Today the Church is used for services in languages other than English, including Portuguese and Croatian.

History

The foundation stone for the new church was laid on 10 November 1912 by then Archbishop John O'Reily.  A procession from St Francis Xavier's Cathedral involving men and youths from various parishes, the Guild Band, the Irish Piper's Band, and representatives of the Hibernian and Australian Catholic Benefit Society resulted in a large crowd, estimated at 10,000 people for the blessing of the stone.  The church was opened on 15 March 1914 by Archbishop O'Reily and the first mass was celebrated by Fr. Patrick Hurley.

References

Churches in Adelaide
Roman Catholic churches completed in 1914
Buildings and structures in Adelaide
History of Adelaide
South Australian Heritage Register
Roman Catholic churches in South Australia
Croatian-Australian culture
Irish-Australian culture
Portuguese-Australian culture
20th-century Roman Catholic church buildings in Australia